Kirsten Fründt (30 March 1967 – 19 January 2022) was a German politician.

References

1967 births
2022 deaths
21st-century German women politicians
People from Marburg
Social Democratic Party of Germany politicians
21st-century German politicians